National Highway 130A, commonly referred to as NH 130A is a national highway in  India. It is a spur road of National Highway 30. NH-130A traverses the state of Chhattisgarh in India.

Route 
Pondi, Pandaria, Mungeli, Bilaspur, Sipat, Dhania, Baloda, Panthora, Gumiya, Urga, Hasti, Bhaisma, Nonbira, Dharamjayagarh, Pathalgaon.

Junctions 

  Terminal near Pondi.
  near Bilaspur.
  near Bilaspur.
  near Bilaspur.
  near Urga.
  Terminal near Pathalgaon.

See also 

 List of National Highways in India
 List of National Highways in India by state

References

External links 

 NH 130A on OpenStreetMap

National highways in India
National Highways in Chhattisgarh